The Supreme Court of Judicature Act 1899 (62 & 63 Vict c 6) was an Act of the Parliament of the United Kingdom.

It was one of the Judicature Acts 1873 to 1899.

See also
Supreme Court of Judicature Act

References
The Public General Acts passed in the Sixty-Second and Sixty-Third Years of the Reign of Her Majesty Queen Victoria. Printed for HMSO by the Queen's Printer. London. 1899. Pages 6 and 7.

United Kingdom Acts of Parliament 1899